Obongsan may refer to:

 Obongsan (Boseong), mountain of Jeollanam-do, southwestern South Korea
 Obongsan (Gyeongju), mountain of Gyeongsangbuk-do, eastern South Korea
 Obongsan (Haman/Jinju), mountain of Gyeongsangnam-do, southeastern South Korea
 Obongsan (Hoengseong/Pyeongchang), mountain of Gangwon-do, South Korea
 Obongsan (Hwacheon/Chuncheon), mountain in the county of Hwacheon, Gangwon-do in South Korea
 Obongsan (North Jeolla), mountain of Jeollabuk-do, western South Korea
 Obongsan (Sangju), mountain of Gyeongsangbuk-do, eastern South Korea
 Obongsan (South Chungcheong), mountain of Chungcheongnam-do, western South Korea
 Obongsan (Wondo), mountain of Jeollanam-do, southwestern South Korea
 Obongsan (Yangsan), mountain of Gyeongsangnam-do, southeastern South Korea
 Obongsan (Chagang), mountain of Chagang-do in North Korea
 Obongsan (Kosong–Kumgang), mountain of Kangwon-do in North Korea
 Obongsan (South Hamgyong), mountain of Hamgyongnam-do in North Korea

See also
Bongshang
Pongsan
Yebongsan